EBX is a series of box sets from Erasure, collecting material originally released on 12″, cassette, CD, and DVD singles, released in the UK by Mute Records between 1999 and 2021. Seven volumes of EBX have been released. EBX1 and EBX2 were released in 1999, then EBX3 and EBX4 in 2001. EBX5 refers to the retrospective box set From Moscow to Mars, released in 2016. The standard EBX series resumed in 2018 with the release of EBX6, followed by EBX7 in 2019 and EBX8 in 2021.

Each set presents, in chronological order, five of the band's singles.  Although cover art was altered (specifically for the sets), the track listings represent all music originally found on the UK versions of their singles, including all remixes and B-sides.

The first four box sets were originally released on CD, and subsequently fell out of print but were released digitally in 2017. Beginning with EBX6, the sets were released only on digital platforms.

EBX1

Disc 1 – "Who Needs Love Like That"
 "Who Needs Love Like That"
 "Push Me Shove Me"
 "Who Needs Love Like That" (Legend mix)
 "Push Me Shove Me" (Extended As Far As Possible mix)
 "Who Needs Love Like That" (Instrumental Workout mix)
 "Who Needs Love Like That" (Mexican mix)
 "Push Me Shove Me" (Tacos mix)

Disc 2 – "Heavenly Action"
 "Heavenly Action"
 "Don't Say No"
 "Heavenly Action" (remix)
 "Don't Say No" (remix)
 "My Heart... So Blue" (Incidental)
 "Heavenly Action" (Yellow Brick mix)
 "Don't Say No" (Ruby Red mix)

Disc 3 – "Oh L'amour"
 "Oh L'amour"
 "March on Down the Line"
 "Oh L'amour" (remix)
 "March on Down the Line" (remix)
 "Gimme! Gimme! Gimme!"
 "Oh L'amour" (PWL Funky Sisters Say 'Ooh La La')
 "Gimme! Gimme! Gimme!" (remix)

Disc 4 – "Sometimes"
 "Sometimes"
 "Sexuality"
 "Sometimes" (12" mix)
 "Sexuality" (12" mix)
 "Say What" (remix)
 "Sometimes" (Shiver mix)
 "Sexuality" (private mix)
 "Senseless" (remix)

Disc 5 – "It Doesn't Have to Be"
 "It Doesn't Have to Be"
 "In the Hall of the Mountain King"
 "It Doesn't Have to Be" (Boop Oopa Doo mix)
 "Who Needs Love Like That" (Betty Boop mix)
 "It Doesn't Have to Be" (Cement mix)
 "Heavenly Action" (Holger Hiller remix)
 "In the Hall of the Mountain King" (new version)

EBX2

Disc 1 – "Victim of Love"
 "Victim of Love" (remix)
 "The Soldier's Return"
 "Victim of Love" (extended mix)
 "The Soldier's Return" (The Return of the Radical Radcliffe mix)
 "Victim of Love" (dub mix)
 "Victim of Love" (Vixen Vitesse mix)
 "The Soldier's Return" (The Machinery mix)
 "If I Could" (Japanese mix)
 "Don't Dance" (live)
 "Leave Me to Bleed" (live)

Disc 2 – "The Circus"
 "The Circus" (remix)
 "The Circus" (Decay Mix)
 "Safety in Numbers" (live)
 "Victim of Love" (live)
 "If I Could" (live)
 "The Circus" (live)
 "Spiralling" (live)
 "It Doesn't Have to Be" (live)
 "Who Needs Love Like That" (live)
 "Gimme! Gimme! Gimme!" (live)
 "Sometimes" (live)
 "Say What" (live)
 "Oh L'amour" (live)
 "The Circus" (Bareback Rider mix)
 "The Circus" (Gladiator mix)
Live tracks are mixed together in one only "concert sequence", however, the original releases were spread on several sides/records. Also, they are presented in order of release, different from the actual sequence of the show.

Disc 3 – "Ship of Fools"
 "Ship of Fools"
 "When I Needed You"
 "Ship of Fools" (Shiver Me Timbers mix)
 "River Deep Mountain High" (Warm Depths mix)
 "When I Needed You" (Melancholic mix)
 "Ship of Fools" (R C mix)
 "River Deep Mountain High" (private dance mix)

Disc 4 – "Chains of Love"
 "Chains of Love" (remix)
 "Don't Suppose"
 "Chains of Love" (Foghorn mix)
 "Don't Suppose" (Country Joe mix)
 "The Good, the Bad and the Ugly"
 "Chains of Love" (Truly in Love with the Marks Bros. mix)
 "The Good, the Bad and the Ugly" (The Dangerous mix)

Disc 5 – "A Little Respect"
 "A Little Respect"
 "Like Zsa Zsa Zsa Gabor"
 "A Little Respect" (extended mix)
 "Like Zsa Zsa Zsa Gabor" (Mark Freegard mix)
 "Love Is Colder Than Death"
 "A Little Respect" (Big Train mix)
 "Like Zsa Zsa Zsa Gabor" (Rico Conning mix)

EBX3

Disc 1 – Crackers International
 "Stop!" (cold ending) – 3:03
 "The Hardest Part" – 3:40
 "Knocking on Your Door" – 2:57
 "She Won't Be Home" – 3:28
 "The Hardest Part" (12" version) – 5:06
 "Knocking on Your Door" (12" version) – 3:59
 "Stop!" (Mark Saunders remix) – 5:47
 "Knocking on Your Door" (Mark Saunders remix) – 6:07
 "God Rest Ye Merry Gentlemen" – 3:10

Disc 2 – "Drama!"
 "Drama!"
 "Sweet, Sweet Baby"
 "Drama!" (Act 2)
 "Sweet, Sweet Baby" (The Moo–Moo mix)
 "Paradise"
 "Drama!" (Krucial mix)
 "Sweet, Sweet Baby" (Medi mix)
 "Paradise" (Lost and Found mix)

Disc 3 – "You Surround Me"
 "You Surround Me"
 "91 Steps"
 "You Surround Me" (Syrinx mix)
 "Supernature"
 "91 Steps" (+24 mix)
 "You Surround Me" (remix)
 "Supernature" (William Orbit mix)
 "91 Steps" (6 pianos mix)
 "Supernature" (Daniel Miller/Phil Legg mix)
 "You Surround Me" (Gareth Jones mix)
 "Supernature" (Mark Saunders mix)

Disc 4 – "Blue Savannah"
 "Blue Savannah"
 "Runaround on the Underground"
 "Blue Savannah" (remix)
 "No G.D.M."
 "Blue Savannah" (Der Deutsche mix II)
 "No G.D.M." (unfinished mix)
 "Runaround on the Underground" (remix)
 "Blue Savannah" (Der Deutsche mix I)

Disc 5 – "Star"
 "Star"
 "Dreamlike State"
 "Star" (Trafalmadore mix)
 "Dreamlike State" (The 12 Hour Technicolor mix)
 "Star" (Interstellar mix)
 "Star" (Soul mix)
 "Dreamlike State" (The 24 Hour Technicolor mix)

EBX4

Disc 1 – "Chorus"
 "Chorus"
 "Over the Rainbow"
 "Chorus" (Pure Trance mix)
 "Snappy" (The Spice Has Risen mix)
 "Chorus" (Transdental Trance mix)
 "Snappy"
 "Chorus" (Aggressive Trance mix)

Disc 2 – "Love to Hate You"
 "Love to Hate You"
 "Vitamin C"
 "Love to Hate You" (remix)
 "Vitamin C" (remix)
 "La La La"
 "Love to Hate You" (Bruce Forest mix)

Disc 3 – "Am I Right?"
 "Am I Right?"
 "Carry on Clangers" (full length)
 "Let It Flow"
 "Waiting for Sex" (full length)
 "Am I Right?" (Dave Bascombe remix)
 "Am I Right?" (The Grid remix)
 "Love to Hate You" (LFO Modulated Filter mix)
 "Chorus" (Vegan mix)
 "B3"
 "Perfect Stranger" (acoustic)

Disc 4 – "Breath of Life"
 "Breath of Life" (7" mix)
 "Breath of Life" (Swiss mix)
 "Breath of Life" (accapella dub remix)
 "Breath of Life" (Divine Inspiration mix)
 "Breath of Life" (Umbilical mix)
 "Breath of Life" (Elixir mix)
 "Breath of Life" (Stripped mix)

Disc 5 – Abba-esque
 "Lay All Your Love on Me"
 "S.O.S."
 "Take a Chance on Me"
 "Voulez Vous"
 "Voulez Vous" (Brain Stem Death Test mix)
 "Lay All Your Love on Me" (No Panties mix)
 "Take a Chance On Me" (Take a Trance on Me mix)
 "S.O.S." (Perimeter mix)

EBX6
The EBX series skipped the number 5, as the catalog number EBX5 had been assigned to the retrospective box set From Moscow to Mars.

EBX7

EBX8

References

Erasure albums
Albums produced by Stephen Hague
Albums produced by Mark Saunders (record producer)
Albums produced by Gareth Jones (music producer)
Albums produced by Flood (producer)
2000 compilation albums
Mute Records compilation albums